Paul Giovanopoulos was born November 11, 1939, in Kastoria, Greece.  He has since made his mark as an American artist, having attended the New York University and School of Visual Arts, before obtaining US citizenship in 1961 at the age of 22.

Paul still lives in New York, and has exhibited work across the United States, and Europe. His work is collected by the estates of Steve Wynn, James Cameron, Sylvester Stallone, and Michael Bloomberg.  His work is featured within more than fifty private and corporate collections, including the New York Public Library and Harvard's JFK School of Government.

Among his many corporate clients are Random House,  Rosenthal China,  United Airlines,  Playboy Magazine,  Del Rey Books,  Warner Books, and  Ritzenhoff AG.
 Paul has also designed covers for at least five novels.

See also 
Official website www.giovanopoulos.com

Notes 

1939 births
Living people
20th-century American painters
American male painters
21st-century American painters
People from Kastoria
Greek emigrants to the United States
20th-century American male artists